The 1944 NAIA men's basketball tournament was not held due to the United States' involvement in World War II. It would resume with the 8th annual 1945 NAIA Division I men's basketball tournament the following year.

References

NAIA Men's Basketball Championship
Tournament